Bill Smith (17 December 1936 – 9 November 2010) was  a former Australian rules footballer who played with Fitzroy in the Victorian Football League (VFL).

Notes

External links 
		

1936 births
2010 deaths
Australian rules footballers from Victoria (Australia)
Fitzroy Football Club players